The Tower of Fools (Polish original title: Narrenturm) is the first historical fantasy novel in the Hussite Trilogy written by Polish fantasy writer Andrzej Sapkowski, first published in 2002 in Polish and in English in 2020. It is followed by Warriors of God (Boży bojownicy) and Lux perpetua.

It tells the story of Reinmar of Bielawa, also called Reynevan von Bielau. The action takes place in Silesia in 1425, at the time of the Hussite Wars.

The setting is mostly historical, with some historical characters and descriptions of particular locations. Fantasy elements include occasional magical feats, artifacts, and non-human characters. The German word Narrenturm means The Tower of Fools, a tower in which, in Middle Ages, people suffering from rare mental diseases were isolated.

The Tower of Fools has been translated to Czech, Slovak, Russian, German, Ukrainian, Romanian, Bulgarian, Hungarian, Finnish, French, Spanish, and Brazilian Portuguese. Rights to the English translation of the trilogy have been acquired, and it has been published in 2020 by Orbit in the US, and Gollancz in the UK, with the translator being David French, translator of several Sapkowski's Witcher books.

References

External links 
 Andrzej Sapkowski's official page(Polish)
 Andrzej Sapkowski's official page
 

Polish historical novels
Polish fantasy novels
Fiction set in the 1420s
2002 novels
Hussite Wars
21st-century Polish novels
Hussite Trilogy